Way 2 Real is a rap group who were signed to  Solo Jam records in the 1990s. Their debut album 38th Street was released in 1995, their only charting single "Tha Butterfly" peaked at number fifteen on the US Rap chart. The lyrics describe the butterfly dance.

Discography

Albums

Singles

References

American rhythm and blues musical groups